Neponset  may refer to:
Neponset, Illinois
Neponset, California
Neponset, Massachusetts, a district in the southeast corner of Dorchester, Boston, Massachusetts
The Neponset River in eastern Massachusetts
The Neponset River Reservation, a state park in Boston, along the Neponset River
The Neponset Native American tribe of eastern Massachusetts

See also
Neponsit, a neighborhood on the Rockaway peninsula of Queens, New York